Castle Grant stands a mile north of Grantown-on-Spey and was the former seat of the Clan Grant chiefs of Strathspey in Highlands, Scotland. It was originally named Freuchie Castle but was renamed Grant in 1694. The castle is a Category A listed building and the grounds are included in the Inventory of Gardens and Designed Landscapes in Scotland.

History

15th-16th centuries

The castle is a Z-plan tower house that dates from the fifteenth century. The lands had been held by the Clan Comyn but passed to the Grants in the fifteenth century and it became their main stronghold.

The castle was originally named Freuchie Castle and James Grant of Freuchie supported James V of Scotland.

17th-18th centuries
The sixth laird, John Grant, made some improvements to the building. The castle was decorated with stone heraldic beasts and animals carved by Ralph Rawlinson. The long gallery and the heads of the dormer windows were painted and gilded by John Anderson of Aberdeen. Although the Grants were Protestants, they joined James Graham, 1st Marquess of Montrose during the Scottish Civil War in the 1640s. The name of the castle changed from Freuchie Castle to Castle Grant in 1694 when the lands were made into the regality of Grant.

Ludovick Grant, the eighth laird, supported the Hanoverians against the Stewarts and fought against the Jacobites in both the Jacobite rising of 1715 and the Jacobite rising of 1745. However Castle Grant was occupied by the Jacobites.

In 1787, Robert Burns visited Castle Grant.

Modern history

The castle was restored by Sir Robert Lorimer in 1912.

It later became derelict, but was restored in the 1990s. The property was purchased for £720,000 by businessman Craig Whyte in 2006. Castle Grant was seized by the Bank of Scotland after Whyte, who had led Rangers F.C. into its administration and liquidation in 2012, refused to make mortgage payments. It was sold in September 2014 to ex-CEO of the Russian Author Society, Sergey Fedotov, who was later arrested for fraud.

Ghost
Castle Grant is allegedly haunted by the ghost of Lady Barbara Grant, daughter of a sixteenth century laird. However her small apparition is said to be sad rather than terrifying. She is said to have died of a broken heart after being imprisoned in a dark closet for falling in love with the wrong man.

See also
Clan Grant
Castles in Scotland

References

External links

profile at www.clangrant-us.org
http://www.strathspey-estate.co.uk/
http://www.grantownmuseum.co.uk/
https://www.pressandjournal.co.uk/fp/news/highlands/1632630/highland-castle-owner-arrested-over-an-alleged-multi-million-pound-fraud/

Castles in Highland (council area)
Inventory of Gardens and Designed Landscapes
Category A listed buildings in Highland (council area)
Listed castles in Scotland
Reportedly haunted locations in Scotland
Castle
Tower houses in Scotland